The Japanese School of Amsterdam (JSA,  Amusuterudamu Nihonjin Gakkō) is a Japanese international school in Amsterdam. As of 1997 the JSA is the Japanese school for about 66% of the Japanese nationals in the country.

The Japanese government subsidizes the school.

History
It was founded in 1979 with 42 students in elementary and junior high school levels.

Its original location was on Frans Halsstraat.

The school was established to provide a Japanese-style education to children of Japanese national employees living in the city. It had 320 students in 1989.

As of April 2022, there were about 170 students enrolled at the JSA.

Culture
As of 1989 the students at the school had some baseball tournaments in which local Dutch schools and international schools using the United States system were opponents, but otherwise, according to Rozemarie de Ruiter of Leeuwarder Courant, the students did not mingle with local children often.

Curriculum
Students in grades 1-5 are required to take Dutch classes. In 1989, each student, every week, had two hours of Dutch as a second language classes. The school also has English classes.

Demographics
Most of the students' parents are diplomats, businesspeople, and teachers. As of 1989 many students return to Japan after the final year of junior high school.

Operations
The school has had a longstanding exchange programme with the Oudvaart School in Sneek. The programme originated from the parents of one student who previously attended the Fenneport School but later transferred to JSA; they continued to have contact with their child's former school and developed contacts between the two institutions.

See also

 Japanese expatriates in the Netherlands
 The Japanese School of Rotterdam

References

External links
 The Japanese School of Amsterdam 
 

International schools in Amsterdam
Amsterdam
Amsterdam
1979 establishments in the Netherlands
Educational institutions established in 1979